The Internetowy System Aktów Prawnych (Internet System of Legal Acts), shortly ISAP, is a database with information about the legislation in force in Poland, which is part of the oldest and one of the most famous Polish legal information systems, and is widely available on the website of the Sejm of the Republic of Poland.

References

External links 
 

 
Computer systems